Enchantment is the debut album recorded by Detroit, Michigan-based R&B group Enchantment, released in 1977 on the Roadshow /United Artists label. The album was remastered and reissued with bonus tracks in 2012 by Big Break Records.

Chart performance
Enchantment reached number eleven on the Billboard R&B albums chart in 1977. The singles "Gloria" and "Sunshine", peaked at numbers five and three on the R&B singles chart, respectively.

Track listing

Personnel
Eddie Willis, Elliot Randall, Jerry Friedman, John Tropea - Guitar
Michael Stokes, Paul Griffin, Willie Hollis - Keyboards
Alvin Taylor, Chuck Rainey, Rodrick Chandler - Bass
Allan Schwartzberg, Tony Robinson - Drums
Jack Brokenshaw, Shaunard Williams - Percussion
Carl Austin, The Detroit Symphony Orchestra, John Trudell - Strings, Horns

Charts

Singles

References

External links
 

1977 debut albums
Enchantment (band) albums
United Artists Records albums